"The Doctor Falls" is the twelfth and final episode of the tenth series of the British science fiction television series Doctor Who. It was written by Steven Moffat, directed by Rachel Talalay, and was broadcast on 1 July 2017 on BBC One. It is the second episode of a two-part story, the first part being "World Enough and Time". The episode received overwhelmingly positive reviews from television critics.

As a continuation of the previous episode, "The Doctor Falls" concludes the first televised multi-Master story of the show, as well as the origin of the Mondasian Cybermen. In the episode, the Doctor (Peter Capaldi) must save himself and the remaining human population of a gigantic colony ship from Mondas, while also dealing with two different incarnations of the Master (Michelle Gomez and John Simm) at once. The episode features a cameo from the First Doctor, now portrayed by David Bradley. He had previously played William Hartnell, the original First Doctor actor, in the 2013 Doctor Who docudrama An Adventure in Space and Time.

Plot 
Aboard the colony ship reversing from the event horizon of a black hole, the Twelfth Doctor finds Bill has been converted into a Cyberman. The Master and Missy capture the Doctor, but he had earlier surreptitiously reprogrammed the Cybernet to target Time Lords as well, forcing them to flee. Nardole arrives in a commandeered shuttlecraft to rescue them. The Doctor is electrocuted by a Cyberman, but is saved by Bill. 

They evacuate to a higher level of the ship containing a solar farm populated by children and a few adults fighting off early Cybermen prototypes. The Doctor recovers, but suppresses the early signs of regeneration. Bill initially remains unaware of her transformation, her strong mind acting like a perception filter, until one of the children inadvertently reveals the truth to her. Bill sheds a tear, which the Doctor calls a hopeful sign. Missy and the Master discover a camouflaged lift, a possible escape route. But when they call for it, an upgraded Cyberman arrives, which the group destroys. The Doctor warns that the time dilation affords the Cybermen more time to evolve and strategize.

Nardole discovers the floor directly below the solar farm contains fuel pipes. He is able to trigger controlled explosions, which are used to exaggerate the humans' defensive strength and defeat the Cybermen's initial attack. Knowing this ploy only delays their inevitable defeat, the Doctor instructs Nardole to lead the human community to a solar farm on another floor and remain there to safeguard them. Bill stays to fight with the Doctor. Despite the Doctor's impassioned plea, Missy and the Master abandon them, intending to take the lift to the lowest level and escape in the Master's TARDIS. Missy, however, changes her mind and stabs the Master, which will trigger his next regeneration. He retaliates by shooting her in the back with his laser screwdriver, telling her she will not regenerate. Both laugh over the irony of their mutual betrayal before the Master departs.

An army of Cybermen arrive, but are warded off by the Doctor until he falls after being shot. Surrounded, the Doctor ignites all the fuel pipes, engulfing the farm in a fireball and destroying or disabling the Cybermen. The Doctor lies still as Bill kneels beside him. She suddenly finds herself outside of her Cyberman body in her human form. Heather ("The Pilot") appears, having found Bill through her tears. She saves Bill by transforming her into an entity like herself. They leave the Doctor inside his TARDIS, and Heather invites Bill to explore the universe with her. Bill sheds tears for the Doctor before leaving with Heather.

The TARDIS arrives in a snowy landscape and the Doctor awakens, briefly dazed and confused, but then he starts regenerating. Refusing to keep continually changing, he emerges and seemingly stops his regeneration. Within, the cloister bell sounds an alarm as the Doctor encounters his original incarnation.

Continuity
Missy mentions that the Doctor once died in a fall, referring to events in Logopolis (1981), in which one of her previous incarnations causes the Fourth Doctor to fall from a radio telescope tower.

During the final battle, the Doctor lists the various sites of his encounters with Cybermen: Mondas (The Tenth Planet), Telos (The Tomb of the Cybermen), Planet 14 (The Invasion), Voga (Revenge of the Cybermen), Canary Wharf ("Doomsday"), and the Moon (The Moonbase). He also mentions Marinus, a reference to the events of Grant Morrison's Sixth Doctor comic The World Shapers, in which that planet's Voord evolve into Cybermen (though that story also suggests that Mondas, Planet 14, and Marinus are all the same planet).

Outside references
Nardole tells the farming community to "Remember the Alamo" as they shore up the farmhouse's defences. The Alamo Mission was overrun by General Santa Anna's troops in 1836, and "Remember the Alamo!" became a rallying cry for the independent troops which later defeated the Mexican Army to form the Republic of Texas.

Missy calls the human community "the Waltons", a reference to the American TV series The Waltons, a show about a farming family with several children during the Great Depression.

Production 
The read through for this episode took place on 21 February 2017. On 6 March 2017 the BBC stated that the work on the final two episodes of the series had begun, "World Enough and Time" and this episode, with Rachel Talalay returning to direct her third consecutive series finale. Filming for the episodes and the series as a whole concluded on 7 April 2017. The final scene involving David Bradley was filmed as part of the filming of the Christmas Special in June 2017.

Cast
 David Bradley appears at the episode's conclusion as the First Doctor. Bradley portrayed William Hartnell, the First Doctor's actor, in the docudrama An Adventure in Space and Time and appeared as the villain Solomon in "Dinosaurs on a Spaceship", as well as voicing the character of Shansheeth Blue in Death of the Doctor in the Doctor Who spin-off series The Sarah Jane Adventures.
 This is the final on-screen appearance of Michelle Gomez as Missy. Since 2018, she has reprised the role for many Doctor Who audio dramas from Big Finish Productions.
 John Simm makes his final on-screen appearance as The Master. He has since reprised the role in the audio drama Masterful from Big Finish Productions alongside Gomez as well as Eric Roberts, Derek Jacobi and Geoffrey Beevers. It was released in 2021.

Broadcast and reception
The episode was watched by 3.75 million viewers overnight. Compared to other programmes that aired on the same night, Doctor Who fared relatively well with a share of 25.3%. The episode received 5.30 million views overall, and it received an Appreciation Index of 83.

Critical reception 

"The Doctor Falls" received overwhelmingly positive reviews, with most reviewers finding it a fitting end to the tenth series. The episode holds a score of 100% on Rotten Tomatoes, with the site consensus reading "'The Doctor Falls' offers a dramatic and satisfying end for this iteration of the show's ever-evolving hero." Praise was directed at Moffat's screenplay, Talalay's direction, and Capaldi's performance.

Alasdair Wilkins from The A.V. Club called the episode a "perfect finale", explaining that the Twelfth Doctor is a Doctor who knows who he is, portrayed by an actor who knows exactly how he wants to play the part of the character, both of which are played into the narrative of the story and blending into the storyline of the Doctor refusing to regenerate. He complimented how the multiple storylines of the series were wrapped up and brought to a satisfying conclusion, as well as respecting the reality of the character's emotions, which were performed with only a couple of small missteps.

Scott Collura of IGN also praised the dynamic between the two Masters, describing the relationship as a mixture of "brother-sister and boyfriend-girlfriend" and its resultant complexities, and how the intentions of the previous incarnation of the Master was to draw Missy back into the traditional evil manner of the character. He stated that the story made enough sense that "Moffat doesn't really even need to write it on the page". He complimented the appearance of David Bradley as the First Doctor, but stated that extending the storyline of the regeneration out over the two episodes of the finale, as well as the Christmas special, was a great concept but did not work in the context of the episode.

Giving the episode a perfect score, Patrick Mulkern of Radio Times singled out the performances as one of the strong points about the episode, saying that Capaldi, Simm and Gomez worked perfectly well together within the episode. He stated that Capaldi was as magnificent as he had been through the series, and that "The Doctor Falls" was an episode dedicated to him, and how he "stands tall" among the competition of Simm's and Gomez's acting. He stated that Simm's Master was not the "loon" that was portrayed seven years ago, but complimented him nonetheless, and that Gomez's portrayal of Missy and the character's soul-searching was "simply superb".

Daniel Jackson of the Daily Mirror also gave the episode a perfect score, and felt the episode was an immensely satisfying conclusion with great storytelling and epic performances, stating that with all the teasers, build up and trailers that had been released in preparation for the episode, "The Doctor Falls" could have resulted in failure, but he complimented how well it turned out. He stated that the episode was an "immensely satisfying, packed, heart string tugging" conclusion to the series, that was the result of "clever storytelling and tremendous acting". He stated that Capaldi and his performance in the episode "simply shines", and that the Twelfth Doctor had never had a better episode through his era.

The episode received a nomination in the Best Special and Visual Effects category at the 2019 BAFTA Cymru Awards.

References

External links

 
 
 

2017 British television episodes
Fiction about black holes
Cybermen television stories
Doctor Who multi-Doctor stories
First Doctor serials
The Master (Doctor Who) television stories
Television episodes written by Steven Moffat
Twelfth Doctor episodes
British television series finales
Doctor Who multi-Master stories
Television episodes set in hospitals
Television episodes set in outer space